Ye Dongsong (born 1951 in Wuwei, Anhui) is a Chinese politician. He served as Chairman of the CPPCC Henan Committee from 2011 to 2018.  In January 2018, he was transferred to the party secretary of the Hebei Provincial Political Consultative Conference and was elected as a member of the 13th CPPCC National Committee.

Ai Wenli, one of Ye's deputies, former vice chairman of the Hebei Provincial Committee of the Chinese People's Political Consultative Conference, was placed under investigation in July 2018 and was sentenced to 8 years in prison for bribery in 2019.

References 

1951 births
Living people
21st-century Chinese politicians
Politicians from Wuhu
People's Republic of China politicians from Anhui
Alternate members of the 17th Central Committee of the Chinese Communist Party
Chinese Communist Party politicians from Anhui